Bear Hands is an American post-punk and indie rock band, consisting of Dylan Rau (vocals and guitar), Val Loper (bass), Ted Feldman (guitar), and TJ Orscher (drums). Hailing from Brooklyn, New York, United States, and formed in 2006, the band signed with Cantora Records in 2010 upon the release of its single "What a Drag".

After releasing their debut LP Burning Bush Supper Club in 2010, Bear Hands toured as the opening act for Passion Pit, GZA, and We Were Promised Jetpacks. Their single "Giants" became a top-ten hit on the Alternative Songs chart in mid-2014.

History
Dylan Rau met Ted Feldman while the two attended Wesleyan University, and were later joined by Loper and Orscher through their previous bands (Sidekick 7 and In Pieces), who were involved in the local Connecticut ska and hardcore punk scene.

During an interview at SXSW 2010, Orscher was quoted saying "Dylan had some material he wanted to put with a band, and a project Val and I were working on for the last half decade just ended. He said he knew the perfect guitarist and when we met up and played for the first time, as cliche as it may be, everything just clicked. We started writing material together, fleshing songs out and started playing some local shows around NYC."

A few months after forming, the band released their first EP, Golden, and became a "New York buzz band" due to popular blog features. Three years later, the group released their 11-track album, Burning Bush Supper Club.

In 2019 they released the single "Blue Lips".

Bear Hands also has toured with Twenty One Pilots as the opening act for the Bandito Tour from May 12 to June 30, 2019.

Discography

Studio albums
 Burning Bush Supper Club (2010)
 Distraction (2014)
 You'll Pay for This (2016)
 Fake Tunes (2019)

References

External links
 Official website

American experimental musical groups
American post-punk music groups
Indie rock musical groups from New York (state)
Musical groups from Brooklyn
Musical groups established in 2006